Kryla (Крила) (Wings) is the fifth studio album by Ukrainian recording artist Jamala. It was released on 12 October 2018 in Ukraine through Enjoy! Records. The album includes the singles "I Believe in U", "Сумую" and "Крила".

Singles
"I Believe in U" was released as the lead single from the album on 14 May 2017. One day ago, Jamala performed this song during the voting interval of the final of the Eurovision Song Contest 2017, which took place at the International Exhibition Centre in Kyiv, Ukraine.

"Сумую" was released as the second single from the album on 7 September 2017.

"Крила" was released as the third single from the album on 21 March 2018. Jamala had previously performed the track as the interval act for the 2018 Ukrainian National Selection for the Eurovision Song Contest,

Release and promotion 
"Kryla" was released on October 12, 2018, for digital download and streaming through recording label Enjoy! Records. Its physical release was February 14, 2019 on LP.

The album was promoted with four music videos, directed by Ihor Stekolenko, Anna Kopilova and Anna Buryachkova, "I Believe in U", "Сумую", "Крила" and "The Great Pretender".

Track listing

Release history

References

External links
Official website

Jamala albums
2018 albums